Caistor Yarborough Academy is a mixed 11–16 yrs secondary school based in the Lincolnshire market town of Caistor, England. The school was founded as Caistor Yarborough School on 18 October 1938, and celebrated its 75th anniversary in 2013. The school serves a large area of rural Lincolnshire, with a number of pupils travelling from outside the local area to attend the school, including pupils from Grimsby and Scunthorpe. It performs consistently well at GCSE.

About the school

Location 
The academy occupies a hilltop site on the edge of the town of Caistor.  Featuring predominantly Georgian architecture, Caistor was established as a Roman fortress, due to its excellent strategic position on the North Western edge of the Lincolnshire Wolds, and a number of ancient freshwater springs, which would have been the primary water source for the settlement.  Now recognised as a valuable historical site, Caistor has numerous listed buildings and two Scheduled Ancient Monuments, one being the original Roman walls.

The academy is on the eastern edge of the town and the main access is from Grimsby Road (A1084) to the North of the site, with the A46 Caistor Bypass forming the Southern boundary of the site.  The nearest major towns and cities include Grimsby, approximately 11 miles northeast of Caistor; Scunthorpe, 17 miles to the northwest; Louth, 19 miles to the southeast and the City of Lincoln, which lies approximately 24 miles southwest of the town.

History 
Built in 1938, Caistor Yarborough School was named after John Edward Pelham, the 7th Earl of Yarborough.  It became an academy in 2011 and changed its name to Caistor Yarborough Academy. It is sited near the border of the Brocklesby House estate, the Yarborough family seat, and the landmark Pelham's Pillar is situated a mile to the north of the Academy.  The Pillar is in the grounds of the Brocklesby estate and is an observation tower built as a memorial to Charles Anderson-Pelham, 1st Earl of Yarborough.

Creative arts 
In September 2006, Caistor Yarborough was designated a specialist Arts College, as part of the (now defunct) Specialist Schools Programme, which was established in England in 1995.  As part of the schools new status, a Creative Arts facility was built on the school site at a cost of over £1,500,000. The facilities were opened on 17 October 2007, by John Godber, a renowned English playwright and Artistic Director of Hull Truck Theatre Company. The new facility houses purpose built studios for dance, music and drama, with a recording studio and other state of the art equipment. For a number of years, the school was also the holder of the Artsmark award from Arts Council England, achieving Gold level in 2007. The award was in recognition of the high level of arts provision in the school curriculum.

Facilities 

Today the Academy has a variety of buildings of different ages including some temporary facilities, due to ongoing development of the site in to ensure that it meets the requirements of a modern educational establishment.

Like many schools of the era, the original building was constructed around a small quadrangle, with the main hall to the east side and classrooms built around the other three sides.  This building still exists, housing mainly technology workshops.  The 'old school', as it is known, also houses the main entrance, school office, and information technology rooms.  On a clear day, Lincoln Cathedral, approximately 24 miles southwest of the town, can clearly be seen in the distance from various points around the school site.

Site developments
The first major development of the site, was the construction of a two-storey classroom block for English and Mathematics, and a single storey block of purpose built labs for Science.

Later, in the 1990s, another two-storey teaching block was constructed, housing classrooms for Religious Studies, History, Geography and Modern Foreign Languages. This new building was attached to the existing English & Maths block and the layouts of some of the existing rooms were changed to provide direct access between the two buildings on both floors. The school library was relocated to a mobile classroom which was no longer needed after the new block was built and an IT suite was installed in its place. The new facility was officially opened in 1998 by Charles Pelham, the current Earl of Yarborough.

Caistor Sports Hall was purpose built for the school in the 1990s. The building houses a fully equipped, multi-purpose sports hall, a weights room, changing rooms, showers, offices, lockers and vending machines. When it was built, it was intended that the sports hall would double as a community sports venue, to ensure financial sustainability for the school. A Sports Development Officer was appointed to schedule an ongoing programme of out of hours community events and bookings, however financial losses estimated at £10,000 per year forced the school to consider closing the facility to the public, as it would have been illegal for the school to subsidise these losses using its own funds. Following a campaign to retain community use of the facility, West Lindsey District Council agreed to manage the building on the school's behalf, commencing 1 April 2006. The council now work in partnership with the school to ensure that the building operates profitable outside of school hours and it is run as a satellite from the De Aston Sports Hall, which is also a shared school/community facility based at the De Aston School in Market Rasen.

Following the construction of the new creative arts facility at the school in 2006, various changes were made to the site. The new building was constructed on the former staff car park, which was relocated. As the facility houses a canteen, this replaced the existing building, which was demolished along with other buildings also left redundant as a result of the build. These buildings had been grouped together next to the schools main driveway, so a new parking area was built in their place, designed to ease the ongoing problem of congestion caused by lack of space for school buses in the driveways. As well as being a creative arts facility for the school, the new building also houses facilities which double as a youth centre for the local community outside of school hours.

Curriculum 
Caistor Yarborough follows the National Curriculum of England at Key Stage 3 and Key Stage 4, with the ultimate goal of all students achieving GCSE passes.  The arts college status of the school permits the provision of supplementary qualifications including:
 BTEC First Certificate, Acting
 BTEC First Certificate, Dance
 BTEC First Certificate, Music

Sources 

 Market Rasen Mail - "Sports hall future secured"
 Listed Buildings in Caistor, Lincolnshire
 Key dates in Caistor's History, showing the year that the school was established

Secondary schools in Lincolnshire
Academies in Lincolnshire
Caistor